(aka Onkyo House) is a company operating sound recording, mixing and mastering studios in Ginza, Tokyo, owned by Magazine House, Ltd and others. It also provides video editing and postproduction services for TV program and commercial film projects. The studio is renowned as one of the best professional recording studios in Japan, used for recording and mixing Japanese popular songs and jazz music.

Studio facilities
 Studio 1
 Mixing Console: SSL SL9064J-64VU, J Computer with Total Recall System
 Monitor Speakers: Dynaudio M4 CUSTOM、Yamaha NS-10M STUDIO、Dynaudio BM6
 Monitor Amplifier: CHORD SPA-1016DA 1232DA、CHORD SPA-1016DA、Sony TA-N 86
 Digital Audio Workstation: Pro Tools|HD3 Accel
 Audio Interface: 192 i/o (x4) 48in/48out
 Multitrack Recorder: Sony PCM-3348、Studer A820M SR/A (with ADAMS.SMITH ZETA-III)
 Master Recorder: Studer A820 (1/2 Inch Head Option)、Panasonic SV-3700
 Reverb: EMT-140、Lexicon 480L、AMS rmx-16、Sony DRE-2000、Sony MU-R201、Yamaha REV-7、Roland SRV-2000
 Effector: AMS dmx-15-80s、Roland SDE-3000A、Yamaha SPX-990、Yamaha SPX-90 II、Eventide H-3000 SE
 Limiter/Compressor: Neve 33609、TUBE-TECH LCA-2B、UREI 1176LN (Silver)
 Piano: Steinway & Sons Model-D
 Studio 2
 Mixing Console: SSL SL4064G+ 64VU, G Computer with Total Recall System
 Monitor Speakers: Westlake TM-3、Yamaha NS-10M STUDIO
 Monitor Amplifier: Goldmund Mimesis 28 Evolution、CHORD SPA-1016DA、Sony TA-N 86
 Digital Audio Workstation: Pro Tools|HD3 Accel
 Audio Interface: 192 i/o (x4) 48in/48out
 Multi Track Recorder: Sony PCM-3348、Studer A820M SR/A (with ADAMS.SMITH ZETA-III)
 Master Recorder: Studer A820 (1/2 Inch Head Option)、Panasonic SV-3700
 Reverb: EMT-140TS、Lexicon 480L、AMS rmx-16、Sony DRE-2000、Sony MU-R 201、Yamaha REV-7、Roland SRV-2000
 Effector: AMS dmx-15-80s、Roland SDE-3000、Yamaha SPX-990、Yamaha SPX-90 II、Eventide H-3000 SE
 Limiter/Compressor: Neve 33609、UREI 1176LN (Black)
 Piano: Steinway & Sons Model-C
 Studio 3
 Control Surface: Digidesign Control24
 Monitor Speakers: ADAM S5A MK2 (x5)、Genelec 7070A Subwoofer (x2)、Dynaudio BM-6、Yamaha NS-10M STUDIO
 Monitor Amplifier: CHORD SPA-1016DA
 Digital Audio Workstation: Pro Tools|HD2 Accel
 Audio Interface: 192 i/o (x1) 16in/8out
 Master Recorder: Panasonic SV-3700、Panasonic SV-3800
 Mic Preamp: Focusrite ISA-110
 Reverb: EMT 140TS、Lexicon 480L、Yamaha REV-5
 Limiter/Compressor: Neve 33609、UREI LA-4、TUBE-TECH CL-1B
 Studio 6
 Mixing Console: SSL SL4064G+ 64VU, G Computer with Total Recall System
 Monitor Speakers: Dynaudio M-3、Yamaha NS-10M STUDIO、Dynaudio BM6
 Monitor Amplifier: Goldmund 29M Evolution、CHORD SPA-1016DA
 Digital Audio Workstation: Pro Tools|HD5 Accel
 Audio Interface: 192 i/o (x4) 24in/48out
 Master Recorder: Studer A820 (1/2 Inch Head Option)、Panasonic SV-3700
 Reverb: EMT-140、Lexicon 480L、AMS rmx-16、Sony DRE-2000、Sony MU-R201、Yamaha REV-7、Roland SRV-2000
 Effector: AMS dmx-15-80s、Roland SDE-3000、Yamaha SPX-990、Yamaha SPX-90 II、Eventide H-3500 DFX/E
 Limiter/Compressor: Neve 33609、UREI 1176LN (Black)、TUBE-TECH CL-1B
 Common Items
 Reverb: Lexicon 224XL
 Mic Preamp: Neve 1073、SHEP 1073、Focusrite ISA115、AMEK 9098、Drawmer 1960、Grace Designs m801
 Limiter/Compressor: dbx 160XT、dbx 165A、Neve 2254、BSS DPR 402、Orban Deesser 526A、EL8M Distressor
 A/D Converter: GML9300H
 Effector: Lexicon M93 Primetime、Eventide H3000、Eventide H949、Roland SDE-2000、EXR III EXCITER、SONG BIRD FS1、SONG BIRD TSC1380、MXR Auto Flanger、MXR Phase Shifter

Discography
2011: Shine On! Volume One (Released September 30, 2011)

Gallery

References

 A Cross-Network Music Industry Guide Musicman 23rd Edition 2012-2013, FB.Communications (2012. page 680~681)
 A Cross-Network Music Industry Guide Musicman 22nd Edition 2011-2012, FB.Communications (2011)
 A Cross-Network Music Industry Guide Musicman 21st Edition 2010-2011, FB.Communications (2010)
 A Cross-Network Music Industry Guide Musicman 20th Edition 2009-2010, FB.Communications (2009)
 A Cross-Network Music Industry Guide Musicman 19th Edition 2008-2009, FB.Communications (2008)

External links

Recording Studios ONKIO HAUS
JAPRS Studio information
Musicman-NET Studio information

Ginza
Recording studios in Japan